This is a list of Scarecrow Press historical dictionaries.

Africa
Titles for Africa are:
 1. Cameroon, by Victor T. Le Vine and Roger P. Nye. 1974. See No. 48.
 2. The Congo, 2nd ed., by Virginia Thompson and Richard Adloff. 1984. See No. 69.
 3. Swaziland, by John J. Grotpeter. 1975.
 4. The Gambia, 2nd ed., by Harry A. Gailey. 1987. See No. 79.
 5. Botswana, by Richard P. Stevens. 1975. See No. 44.
 6. Somalia, by Margaret F. Castagno. 1975. See No. 87.
 7. Benin (Dahomey), 2nd ed., by Samuel Decalo. 1987. See No. 61.
 8. Burundi, by Warren Weinstein. 1976. See No. 73.
 9. Togo, 3rd ed., by Samuel Decalo. 1996.
 10. Lesotho, by Gordon Haliburton. 1977. See No. 90.
 11. Mali, 3rd ed., by Pascal James Imperato. 1996. See No. 107.
 12. Sierra Leone, by Cyril Patrick Foray. 1977.
 13. Chad, 3rd ed., by Samuel Decalo. 1997.
 14. Upper Volta, by Daniel Miles McFarland. 1978.
 15. Tanzania, by Laura S. Kurtz. 1978.
 16. Guinea, 3rd ed., by Thomas O’Toole with Ibrahima Bah-Lalya. 1995. See No. 94.
 17. Sudan, by John Voll. 1978. See No. 53.
 18. Rhodesia/Zimbabwe, by R. Kent Rasmussen. 1979. See No. 46.
 19. Zambia, 2nd ed., by John J. Grotpeter, Brian V. Siegel, and James R. Pletcher. 1998. See No. 106.
 20. Niger, 3rd ed., by Samuel Decalo. 1997.
 21. Equatorial Guinea, 3rd ed., by Max Liniger-Goumaz. 2000.
 22. Guinea-Bissau, 3rd ed., by Richard Lobban and Peter Mendy. 1997.
 23. Senegal, by Lucie G. Colvin. 1981. See No. 65.
 24. Morocco, by William Spencer. 1980. See No. 71.
 25. Malawi, by Cynthia A. Crosby. 1980. See No. 54.
 26. Angola, by Phyllis Martin. 1980. See No. 92.
 27. The Central African Republic, by Pierre Kalck. 1980. See No. 51.
 28. Algeria, by Alf Andrew Heggoy. 1981. See No. 66.
 29. Kenya, by Bethwell A. Ogot. 1981. See No. 77.
 30. Gabon, by David E. Gardinier. 1981. See No. 58.
 31. Mauritania, by Alfred G. Gerteiny. 1981. See No. 68.
 32. Ethiopia, by Chris Prouty and Eugene Rosenfeld. 1981. See No. 91.
 33. Libya, 3rd ed., by Ronald Bruce St. John. 1998. See No. 100.
 34. Mauritius, by Lindsay Riviere. 1982. See No. 49.
 35. Western Sahara, by Tony Hodges. 1982. See No. 55.
 36. Egypt, by Joan Wucher King. 1984. See No. 89.
 37. South Africa, by Christopher Saunders. 1983. See No. 78.
 38. Liberia, by D. Elwood Dunn and Svend E. Holsoe. 1985. See No. 83.
 39. Ghana, by Daniel Miles McFarland. 1985. See No. 63.
 40. Nigeria, 2nd ed., by Anthony Oyewole and John Lucas. 2000.
 41. Côte d’Ivoire (The Ivory Coast), 2nd ed., by Robert J. Mundt. 1995.
 42. Cape Verde, 2nd ed., by Richard Lobban and Marilyn Halter. 1988. See No. 62.
 43. Zaire, by F. Scott Bobb. 1988. See No. 76.
 44. Botswana, 2nd ed., by Fred Morton, Andrew Murray, and Jeff Ramsay. 1989. See No. 70.
 45. Tunisia, 2nd ed., by Kenneth J. Perkins. 1997.
 46. Zimbabwe, 2nd ed., by Steven C. Rubert and R. Kent Rasmussen. 1990. See No. 86.
 47. Mozambique, by Mario Azevedo. 1991. See No. 88.
 48. Cameroon, 2nd ed., by Mark W. DeLancey and H. Mbella Mokeba. 1990.
 49. Mauritius, 2nd ed., by Sydney Selvon. 1991.
 50. Madagascar, by Maureen Covell. 1995. See No. 98.
 51. The Central African Republic, 2nd ed., by Pierre Kalck, translated by Thomas O’Toole. 1992. See No. 93.
 52. Angola, 2nd ed., by Susan H. Broadhead. 1992. See No. 92.
 53. Sudan, 2nd ed., by Carolyn Fluehr-Lobban, Richard A. Lobban Jr., and John Obert Voll. 1992. See No. 85.
 54. Malawi, 2nd ed., by Cynthia A. Crosby. 1993. See No. 84.
 55. Western Sahara, 2nd ed., by Anthony Pazzanita and Tony Hodges. 1994. See No. 96.
 56. Ethiopia and Eritrea, 2nd ed., by Chris Prouty and Eugene Rosenfeld. 1994. See No. 91.
 57. Namibia, by John J. Grotpeter. 1994.
 58. Gabon, 2nd ed., by David E. Gardinier. 1994. See No. 101.
 59. Comoro Islands, by Martin Ottenheimer and Harriet Ottenheimer. 1994.
 60. Rwanda, by Learthen Dorsey. 1994. See No. 105.
 61. Benin, 3rd ed., by Samuel Decalo. 1995.
 62. Republic of Cape Verde, 3rd ed., by Richard Lobban and Marlene Lopes. 1995. See No. 104.
 63. Ghana, 2nd ed., by David Owusu-Ansah and Daniel Miles Mc-Farland. 1995. See No. 97.
 64. Uganda, by M. Louise Pirouet. 1995.
 65. Senegal, 2nd ed., by Andrew F. Clark and Lucie Colvin Phillips. 1994.
 66. Algeria, 2nd ed., by Phillip Chiviges Naylor and Alf Andrew Heggoy. 1994. See No. 102.
 67. Egypt, 2nd ed., by Arthur Goldschmidt Jr. 1994. See No. 89.
 68. Mauritania, 2nd ed., by Anthony G. Pazzanita. 1996.
 69. Congo, 3rd ed., by Samuel Decalo, Virginia Thompson, and Richard Adloff. 1996.
 70. Botswana, 3rd ed., by Jeff Ramsay, Barry Morton, and Fred Morton. 1996. See No. 108.
 71. Morocco, 2nd ed., by Thomas K. Park. 1996. See No. 95.
 72. Tanzania, 2nd ed., by Thomas P. Ofcansky and Rodger Yeager. 1997.
 73. Burundi, 2nd ed., by Ellen K. Eggers. 1997. See No. 103.
 74. Burkina Faso, 2nd ed., by Daniel Miles McFarland and Lawrence Rupley. 1998.
 75. Eritrea, by Tom Killion. 1998.
 76. Democratic Republic of the Congo (Zaire), by F. Scott Bobb. 1999. (Revised edition of Historical Dictionary of Zaire, No. 43)
 77. Kenya, 2nd ed., by Robert M. Maxon and Thomas P. Ofcansky. 2000.
 78. South Africa, 2nd ed., by Christopher Saunders and Nicholas Southey. 2000.
 79. The Gambia, 3rd ed., by Arnold Hughes and Harry A. Gailey. 1999.
 80. Swaziland, 2nd ed., by Alan R. Booth. 2000.
 81. Republic of Cameroon, 3rd ed., by Mark W. DeLancey and Mark Dike DeLancey. 2000.
 82. Djibouti, by Daoud A. Alwan and Yohanis Mibrathu. 2000.
 83. Liberia, 2nd ed., by D. Elwood Dunn, Amos J. Beyan, and Carl Patrick Burrowes. 2001.
 84. Malawi, 3rd ed., by Owen J. Kalinga and Cynthia A. Crosby. 2001.
 85. Sudan, 3rd ed., by Richard A. Lobban Jr., Robert S. Kramer, and Carolyn Fluehr-Lobban. 2002.
 86. Zimbabwe, 3rd ed., by Steven C. Rubert and R. Kent Rasmussen. 2001.
 87. Somalia, 2nd ed., by Mohamed Haji Mukhtar. 2002.
 88. Mozambique, 2nd ed., by Mario Azevedo, Emmanuel Nnadozie, and Tomé Mbuia João. 2003.
 89. Egypt, 3rd ed., by Arthur Goldschmidt Jr. and Robert Johnston. 2003.
 90. Lesotho, 2nd ed., by Scott Rosenberg, Richard Weisfelder, and Michelle Frisbie-Fulton. 2004.
 91. Ethiopia, New Edition, by David H. Shinn and Thomas P. Ofcansky. 2004.
 92. Angola, New Edition, by W. Martin James. 2004.
 93. Central African Republic, 3rd ed., by Pierre Kalck, translated by Xavier-Samuel Kalck. 2005.
 94. Guinea, 4th ed., by Thomas O’Toole with Janice E. Baker. 2005.
 95. Morocco, 2nd ed., by Thomas K. Park and Aomar Boum. 2006.
 96. Western Sahara, 3rd ed., by Anthony G. Pazzanita. 2005.
 97. Ghana, 3rd ed., by David Owusu-Ansah. 2005.
 98. Madagascar, 2nd ed., by Philip M. Allen and Maureen Covell. 2005.
 99. Sierra Leone, New Edition, by C. Magbaily Fyle. 2005.
 100. Libya, 4th ed., by Ronald Bruce St John. 2006.
 101. Gabon, 3rd ed., by David E. Gardinier and Douglas A. Yates 3 2006.
 102. Algeria, 3rd ed., by Phillip Naylor. 2006.
 103. Burundi, 3rd ed., by Ellen K. Eggers. 2007.
 104. Republic of Cape Verde, 4th ed., by Richard A. Lobban Jr. and Paul Khalil Saucier. 2007.
 105. Rwanda, New Edition, by Aimable Twagilamana. 2007.
 106. Zambia, 3rd ed., by David J. Simon, James R. Pletcher, and Brian V. Siegel. 2008.
 107. Mali, 4th ed., by Pascal James Imperato, Gavin H. Imperato, and Austin C. Imperato. 2008.
 108. Botswana, 4th ed., by Fred Morton, Jeff Ramsay, and Part Themba Mgadla. 2008.

Americas

Asia

Europe

References

Dictionaries
Series of history books
English-language encyclopedias